Black Spider is the name of several fictional DC Comics supervillains. The first two were both primarily enemies of Batman.

Fictional character biographies

Eric Needham
The original Black Spider first appeared in Detective Comics #463 (September 1976) and was created by Gerry Conway. Eric Needham is a small-time crook who is addicted to heroin. Eric was first sentenced to prison after mugging and nearly killing an elderly woman but, as a minor, he was out in three years. Over the next two years, Eric married his friend Linda Morrel and they had a son, Michael. Desperate for money to buy more drugs, he robs a liquor store. He kills the owner, who turns out to be his father. After being arrested, he kicks the habit out of remorse and begins a war on the drug trade.

Donning a costume, he becomes a self-styled vigilante and begins killing those suspected of dealing drugs. This brings him into conflict with Batman. Needham believes that the two should be allies, as he sees common purpose in their war against criminals. His murderous methods, however, continually put him at odds with the Dark Knight.

Needham's paraphernalia and missions as the Black Spider were bankrolled by a man who is secretly involved with narcotics and wants to take out the competition.

Despite his professed desire to fight criminals, the Black Spider occasionally allies himself with costumed villains (most notably in the gathering of super-villains in Detective Comics #526 and Batman #400). Ostensibly, Black Spider's goal in this is to seek revenge against Batman, or at least, this is how he attempted to justify his actions in his own mind. Needham also faced King Faraday and Nightshade in a brief flashback in Secret Origins #28.

During his war, Needham's wife and son are killed by a drug lord who discovers the Black Spider's identity. In a rage, the Spider prepares for one final assault. After being shot multiple times, Needham invades the drug lord's headquarters and detonates explosives strapped to his back, killing the drug dealers in the process.

Eric Needham later turns up in Neil Gaiman's critically acclaimed fantasy comic The Sandman dating supporting character Lyta Hall. No explanation was given for his resurrection.

Whatever the case, Needham's survival has since been confirmed and the character has made subsequent appearances as the Black Spider, such as in the miniseries Underworld Unleashed. He was seen in Identity Crisis as an ally of Deadshot, Monocle, and Merlyn. He is later a member of The Society.

He is one of the villains sent to retrieve the Get Out of Hell Free card from the Secret Six.

The New 52
In The New 52, Eric first appears as a member of the Suicide Squad, though he resents being forced to work with criminals despite being one himself. Despite his holier-than-thou attitude towards much of the team, he does not view himself as a hero, just as a man who kills criminals, even willing to smother them in their hospital beds. He is also slightly overconfident of his abilities, getting himself injured multiple times while assuming he could easily defeat several armed opponents. Amanda Waller eventually offers him an opportunity to quit the team, stating that he is not a monster like the others. Eric declines, stating that he "needs" the team after losing his family.

However, this turns out to be a ploy, as Needham was actually a double agent working for Regulus of the terrorist group Basilisk. A double of Black Spider had accompanied the team to Basilisk's hideout, only to be shot by Deadshot, who realized it wasn't the true Spider because he would've dodged the bullet. The real Black Spider had invaded Amanda Waller's grandmother's home to kill both of them, but he underestimates the cunning of both the senior Waller and the younger Waller and is defeated. He was then locked away in maximum security at Belle Reve.

Johnny LaMonica

The second Black Spider first appeared in Batman #518 (May 1995). Professional hitman Johnny LaMonica takes the name "Black Spider" when he is sent to kill the crime lord Black Mask. He is thwarted by Batman and sent to prison. He sustains injuries during this incident that leaves his face a disfigured web of scars, giving his choice of codename an ironic touch.

He is later killed by Detective Crispus Allen during a gang shooting. Black Spider had opened fire on Detective Renee Montoya, preparing to kill her, when Allen unloaded his magazine on the villain. Jim Corrigan sold the bullet that killed Black Spider on the black market.

Derrick Coe
A third Black Spider appears shortly after as a member of the Society. He first appeared in Birds of Prey #87 (December 2005). Other Society members reported that he was presumed dead. Real name Derrick Coe, he apparently bought his "villain franchise" from the Calculator, who assigns him to help torture Savant into revealing the identity of Oracle. When Oracle sends in her task force, the Birds of Prey, to rescue Savant, Savant throws Coe out a window, nearly killing him — Black Canary speculates that he may be a metahuman, allowing him to survive the experience.

He was also seen in Gotham during the "Battle for the Cowl", fighting and losing to Manhunter.

Coe later resurfaces as a member of the new Injustice League and one of the exiled supervillains in Salvation Run.

Council of Spiders version
An unnamed Black Spider was a member of the group of assassins known as the "Council of Spiders". This Black Spider came into conflict with Red Robin and was defeated.

DC Rebirth
Black Spider reappears in DC Rebirth. He is one of the many villains that attempts to kill Batman for Two-Face's bounty. Needham this time has two cybernetic claws on his back and utilizes a machine gun. Batman defeats him and cuts these arms off with a chainsaw.

Alternate versions

Bulletman
One of Bulletman's enemies was named Black Spider under the civilian name Jules Rey. This version was a criminal deported and locked in a dungeon where he went blind and insane. The criminal managed to befriend the large spiders that lived there. Dubbing himself Black Spider, he went back to the U.S. to take vengeance on those who deported him. Bulletman and Bulletgirl saved Black Spider's captives and killed the villain.

In other media

Television
The Eric Needham incarnation of Black Spider appears in Young Justice, voiced by Josh Keaton. This version is a member of the League of Shadows who wields wrist-mounted web-shooters and is known to mock opponents with relentless quips and bantering.

Film
 Black Spider makes a cameo appearance in Superman/Batman: Public Enemies.
 The Eric Needham incarnation of Black Spider appears in Batman: Assault on Arkham, voiced by Giancarlo Esposito. This version is a vigilante responsible for killing several gangsters across the United States. He is recruited into Amanda Waller's Suicide Squad to retrieve sensitive information from the Riddler and implanted with a nano-bomb in his neck to keep him in line. However, the squad encounters Batman, who secretly knocks out Black Spider and switches suits with him to investigate the squad. After the squad discovers the Riddler knows how to deactivate their bombs, they allow him to do so. Waller learns of their treachery and attempts to detonate their bombs before then, but succeeds in killing Black Spider and King Shark while the rest of the squad survive and discover Batman's ruse.

Miscellaneous
 The Eric Needham incarnation of Black Spider appears in The Batman Adventures #5-8 as a member of Black Mask's gang.
 The Eric Needham incarnation of Black Spider appears in issue #3-4 of the Young Justice tie-in comic book series.
 The Johnny LaMonica incarnation of Black Spider appears in Batman: Sins of the Father, a comic that takes place after the events of Batman: The Telltale Series.

See also
 List of Batman family enemies
Tarantula (DC Comics)

References

External links
 Black Spider appearances at Grand Comics Database

Characters created by Doug Moench
Characters created by Gail Simone
Characters created by Gerry Conway
Comics characters introduced in 1976
Comics characters introduced in 1995
Comics characters introduced in 2005
Fictional drug addicts
Fictional heroin users
Fictional criminals
DC Comics supervillains
DC Comics martial artists
DC Comics male supervillains
Fictional African-American people
Fictional assassins in comics
Articles about multiple fictional characters
Suicide Squad members
Vigilante characters in comics
Batman characters